Meductic is an unincorporated community along the Saint John River in southern New Brunswick, Canada. It held village status prior to 2023. It is approximately 33 kilometres southeast of Woodstock.

History

During the Expulsion of the Acadians, the village was burned in the St. John River Campaign (1758). Until the 18th century, Meductic was the largest settlement of the Wolastoqiyik people.

On 1 January 2023, Meductic amalgamated with the village of Canterbury and all or part of five local service districts to form the new village of Lakeland Ridges. The community's name remains in official use.

Demographics 

Notable people

See also
List of communities in New Brunswick

References

  The old Meductic Fort and the Indian chapel of Saint Jean Baptiste: paper read before the New Brunswick Historical Society (1897)

Former villages in New Brunswick
Communities in York County, New Brunswick